Grünsee (Berchtesgadener Land) is a lake in Bavaria, Germany. At an elevation of 1474 m, its surface area is 3.92 ha.

Lakes of Bavaria